Anchieta's sunbird (Anthreptes anchietae) is a species of bird in the family Nectariniidae.
It is found in Angola, the DRC, Malawi, Mozambique, Tanzania, and Zambia, and is named after José Alberto de Oliveira Anchieta.

References

Anchieta's sunbird
Birds of Southern Africa
Anchieta's sunbird
Taxonomy articles created by Polbot